Maria Rosada (1899-1970) was an Italian film editor.

Selected filmography
 The Three Wishes (1937)
The House of Shame (1938)
 A Wife in Danger (1939)
 The Fornaretto of Venice (1939)
 Unjustified Absence (1939)
 Captain Fracasse (1940)
 The Mask of Cesare Borgia (1941)
 Before the Postman (1942)
 Sleeping Beauty (1942)
 Harlem (1943)
 The Innkeeper (1944)
 Cats and Dogs (1952)
 Martin Toccaferro (1953)
 The Mysteries of Paris (1957)

References

Bibliography
 Peter Brunette. Roberto Rossellini. University of California Press, 1996.

External links

1899 births
1970 deaths
Italian film editors
Italian women film editors